Khalid Al-Shuwayyi (born 8 April 1996) is a Saudi Arabian professional footballer who plays as a defender for Al-Riyadh.

References

External links

1996 births
Living people
Saudi Arabian footballers
Association football defenders
Al Nassr FC players
Al-Mujazzal Club players
Al-Tai FC players
Al-Jabalain FC players
Al-Riyadh SC players
Saudi Professional League players
Saudi First Division League players